Bnei Re'em (lit. Sons of Re'em) is a religious moshav in central Israel. Located in the Shephelah, it falls under the jurisdiction of Nahal Sorek Regional Council.

Etymology
The moshav is named for the Gerrer Rebbe, Rabbi Avraham Mordechai Alter. "Re'em" is a Hebrew acronym.

History
Bnei Re'em was established in 1949 by Jewish immigrants from Eastern Europe and Jewish refugees from Yemen on the lands of the depopulated   Palestinian  village of Al-Masmiyya al-Kabira. Until a pump was installed that worked on an  automated sabbath clock, an Arab family that lived in the area served as a Sabbath Goy.

References

Moshavim
Religious Israeli communities
Populated places established in 1949
Populated places in Central District (Israel)
1949 establishments in Israel
Yemeni-Jewish culture in Israel